Capetillo is a Mexican family with a long tradition in bullfighting. Among the most famous members are:

 Manuel Capetillo, a matador
 Guillermo Capetillo, a singer/actor and bullfighter and son of Manuel
 Eduardo Capetillo, a singer/actor and half-brother of Guillermo and Manolito

See also
 Raymundo Capetillo, a Mexican actor not related to the above

Mexican families
Surnames